Boissise-le-Roi is a commune in the Seine-et-Marne department in the Île-de-France region in north-central France.

Demographics
The inhabitants are called Régiboissiens.

Twin towns
Boissise-le-Roi is twinned with:

  Caerano di San Marco, Italy, since 2002

  Alvelos, in Barcelos, Portugal

See also
Communes of the Seine-et-Marne department

References

External links

1999 Land Use, from IAURIF (Institute for Urban Planning and Development of the Paris-Île-de-France région)
 
Chateau of Boissise, built by the de Thumery family
History of Boissise-le-Roi 
History of Church Saint-Denis 

Communes of Seine-et-Marne